Parmelee Transfer Company  was founded in 1852 by Franklin Parmelee  to move passengers and baggage between Chicago's downtown railroad terminals. Originally a horse-drawn hack, the company evolved into a motor driven van shuttle and limousine service. The City of Chicago granted Parmelee the exclusive franchise for station transfer trade moving passengers and baggage, which the company held until 1971.

After Amtrak consolidated inter-city railroad passenger services at Chicago's Union Station, Parmelee ceased operations under the Parmelee name, but continues as Continental Airport Express.

References

History of Chicago
Transport companies established in 1853
Transportation in Chicago
American companies established in 1853